Meritites IV (also  known as Meritites II as she was the second queen by that name) was a queen from the Sixth Dynasty. She was believed to be a wife of Pepi I Meryre, but her title of King’s Daughter of his body of Pepy-Mennefer (s3t-niswt-nt-kht.f-ppy-mn-nfr) is now understood to indicate that she was a daughter of Pepi I Meryre and wife of a king Neferkare, presumably Pepi II. One more evidence for that theory is that her name means "Beloved of her father".

Titles 
Her titles include: Great one of the hetes-sceptre, She who sees Horus and Seth (m33t-hrw-stsh), Great of Praises (wrt-hzwt), King’s Wife (hmt-nisw), King’s Wife, his beloved (hmt-nisw meryt.f), and Companion of Horus (smrt-hrw).

Burial 
Meritites IV was buried in Saqqara. Her pyramid lies to the south of the pyramid of Pepi I. Meritites' pyramid lies to the southwest of the complex of Queen Inenek-Inti and to the south of the queen's pyramid referred to as the "Southwestern pyramid".

References

Queens consort of the Sixth Dynasty of Egypt
23rd-century BC women
22nd-century BC women
Pepi I Meryre